Henry Ott (March 6, 1865 – October 7, 1949) was an American farmer, businessman, and politician.

Born in Cedar Grove, Wisconsin, Ott moved with his parents to the town of Plymouth, Sheboygan County, Wisconsin. He went to Plymouth High School  in Plymouth, Wisconsin. Ott was a dairy farmer and was involved with the fire insurance business and the State Bank of Plymouth. Ott served as the Plymouth town clerk, the town, assessor, and the town board chairman. In 1913, 1921, and 1923, Ott served in the Wisconsin State Assembly and was a Republican. Ott died at a hospital in Plymouth, Wisconsin.

Notes

1865 births
1949 deaths
People from Plymouth, Wisconsin
Businesspeople from Wisconsin
Farmers from Wisconsin
Mayors of places in Wisconsin
People from Cedar Grove, Wisconsin
Republican Party members of the Wisconsin State Assembly